Wagon Bed Spring, also known historically as the Lower Spring or Lower Cimarron Spring, is a historic former spring in Grant County, Kansas, United States. In the 19th century it was an important watering spot on the Cimarron Cutoff of the Santa Fe Trail, where migrants on the trail often camped. The spring is now dry, primarily due to irrigation lowering the water table in the area. It was declared a National Historic Landmark in 1961.

Description
The site is marked by interpretive signage. The river is a historically intermittent stream, and its channel has been altered since the 19th century by flooding, and the actual spring site is now in the river bed. The flow of the spring came from an outcropping of the Ogallala Formation. Center pivot irrigation adjacent to the spring resulted in lowering of the water table and the spring ceased to flow in the 1960s.

The site is historically and archaeologically significant as a major migrant camp site on the Santa Fe Trail.  The spring was one of the few reliable sources of water along the Cimarron Cutoff between the watersheds of the Arkansas and Cimarron Rivers, and many migrant and military groups camped here in the 60 years or so that the trail was used. Mountain man Jedediah Smith was probably killed here or near here on May 27, 1831 by Comanches.

The Daughters of the American Revolution placed a historic marker near the spring in 1907.  In 1914, a series of floods on the Cimarron River began to  significantly alter the topography of the area, eventually placing the location within a much widened river bed.  The site was designated a National Historic Landmark in 1960, but its boundaries were not precisely delineated.  It had also not been investigated archaeologically to any significant degree, although numerous accounts give descriptions of the site over time.  Amateur investigations in the 1980s suggested that major elements of the site, in particular the places where migrant groups camped, fell outside the assumed boundaries of the site.  The National Park Service instituted formal investigations in the early 1990s resulted in a formal characterization of the spring area, and identification of the core areas used for camping.  The landmarked area also includes sections of preserved wagon ruts.

See also
List of National Historic Landmarks in Kansas
National Register of Historic Places listings in Grant County, Kansas

References

External links
 
 Lower Cimarron Spring (Wagon Bed Spring)
 Wagon Bed Springs
 Wagon Bed/Lower Cimarron Springs

Geography of Grant County, Kansas
Santa Fe Trail
National Historic Landmarks in Kansas
Natural features on the National Register of Historic Places in Kansas
Bodies of water of Grant County, Kansas
Springs of Kansas
National Register of Historic Places in Grant County, Kansas
Road transportation infrastructure on the National Register of Historic Places
Archaeological sites on the National Register of Historic Places in Kansas